You and The Night and The Music is a 1998 studio album by Helen Merrill.

Reception

Allmusic reviewer Stephen Thomas Erlewine said the album is a "wonderful collection of standards, augmented by two originals from Helen Merrill and Torrie Zito. Merrill's voice hasn't weakened much over the years, and there's true warmth to her performances on this album...There's a relaxed charm to the music that helps make You and the Night and the Music one of her better latter-day efforts".

Track listing
 "Song of Delilah" (Victor Young, Ray Evans, Jay Livingston) - 4:16
 "Beautiful Love (Love Is LikeThis)" (Haven Gillespie, Young) - 5:20
 "And in You Came" (Helen Merrill, Torrie Zito) - 4:23
 "Ill Wind" (Harold Arlen, Ted Koehler) - 3:03
 "I Want to Be Happy" (Irving Caesar, Vincent Youmans) - 3:58
 "My Funny Valentine" (Lorenz Hart, Richard Rodgers) - 4:23
 "You and the Night and the Music" (Howard Dietz, Arthur Schwartz) - 3:45
 "Young and Foolish" (Albert Hague, Arnold B. Horwitt) - 6:47
 "Don't Leave Me Alone" (Merrill, Zito) - 3:28
 "All of Me" (Gerald Marks, Seymour Simons) - 4:14
 "Street of Dreams" (Victor Young, Sam M. Lewis) - 4:10

Personnel
Helen Merrill - liner notes, producer, vocals
Tom Harrell - flugelhorn, trumpet
Bob Milikan - trumpet
Masabumi Kikuchi - piano
Torrie Zito - piano, electric piano
Charlie Haden - double bass
Paul Motian - drums
Production
Jean-Philippe Allard - producer
Jay Newland - engineer, mastering, mixing
Daniel Richard - executive producer
Joe Lizzi - assistant engineer
Maureen Murphy - coordination
Patrick Votan

References

1998 albums
Helen Merrill albums
Verve Records albums